The City Creek Center (CCC) is a mixed-use development with an upscale open-air shopping center, office and residential buildings, fountain, and simulated creek near Temple Square in downtown Salt Lake City, Utah, United States. It is an undertaking by Property Reserve, Inc. (PRI), the commercial real estate division of the Corporation of the President of The Church of Jesus Christ of Latter-day Saints (LDS Church) and Taubman Centers, Inc. (TCI). The CCC integrates shopping and residential elements, with foliage-lined walkways and streams covering two blocks in the heart of downtown Salt Lake. PRI invested in the housing and parking elements of the mall, while TCI owns and operates the shopping center itself. The CCC opened to the general public on March 22, 2012. The City Creek Center is part of an estimated $5 billion sustainable design project to revitalize downtown Salt Lake City. The CCC project itself has been estimated to cost around $1.5 billion.

History
Development of the CCC began in 2003, when a for-profit company owned by the LDS Church purchased the Crossroads Plaza Mall, a shopping center on the west side of Main Street from the ZCMI Center Mall. Both malls (known unofficially as the “Main Street Malls”) had been constructed in the 1970s. In 2001, the Boyer Company completed its new open-air mall called The Gateway, four blocks to the west of Crossroads and ZCMI, drawing more business away from Main Street. Soon after, the Nordstrom store at Crossroads announced its intentions to leave the mall and open a new store at Gateway. In order to avert urban blight, the LDS Church purchased the mall in 2003 and redeveloped the area. The church enlisted the help of TCI to help it redesign the malls into a single project and recruit retailers to fill it. In October 2006, the concept design of CCC was announced. A ribbon-cutting ceremony took place on March 22, 2012.

Design and transportation

The CCC features  of mixed use residential, office and retail space with the main mall itself featuring an open-air design, similar to the competing The Gateway mall. The CCC also won an award for its retractable roof. The mall is intended to cater predominantly to pedestrian traffic. Multi-level sidewalks feature six total acres of green space, fountains, and a stream. A pedestrian skyway links the two city blocks across Main Street. The site is served by the City Center station of the TRAX light rail system, and a large underground parking lot capable of holding 5,600 vehicles.

Skybridge
The skybridge connects the two upper floors of the shopping center across Main Street and acts as a pedestrian connector. It weighs 320,000 pounds and includes roof panels that can be opened, glass walls and interior benches. The skybridge is located directly above the CCC's TRAX light rail station and was constructed by Jacobsen Construction.

Landscape architecture
SWA, which provided landscape architecture and urban design services, organized the site along the city's street-grid to keep CCC integrated to the urban fabric and took inspiration from the town's original City Creek to create a 1.2 km waterway traversing the property as a pedestrian-oriented green space. 

Other elements of the landscape design support the overall concept of urban living, with pocket parks, roof gardens, and landscape connections throughout the project.

Tenants

Retail

The CCC is anchored by two national department stores: Nordstrom and Macy's. In the original plan, a third anchor, Dillard's, was also planned for the mall. After public outcry about the alignment of the restored, historic Regent Street area in the project, and the associated realignment, it left insufficient space for the proposed  store, so plans for the Dillard's store were cancelled. More room for specialty retailers and an additional condominium tower were inserted into the plan in its place. A Harmons grocery store is located on the east most (3rd) block, at the corner of 100 South and 200 East streets. The northeast area containing the Key Bank Tower and adjoining Eagle Gate Tower was completed in June 2009. It contains the Food Court with a view to the west. A Walgreens opened in 2018 after the Rite Aid had closed. Several eateries are conveniently located there, including McDonald's, Chang Chun, Sbarro, Red Iguana, and Bocata. The mall has a valet-assisted underground parking located under the Key Bank Tower. Deseret Book's flagship store opened March 2010 on the northeast corner of Richards Street, in the east building of the Richards Court, directly across from Temple Square. Other first tenants of the mall include The Disney Store, Porsche Design, and The Cheesecake Factory, plus 100 more.

Office

The Kirton McConkie law firm building was the sole office building constructed as part of the CCC.

Several existing office buildings in the area maintain their positions in the CCC development. The Key Bank Tower, however, was demolished, and its tenants relocated to the Beneficial Financial Group Tower nearby, which was renamed Key Bank Building. That building's chief tenant relocated to the Gateway Tower West, which was renamed as the new Beneficial Financial Group Tower. Residents and media challenged an initial decision to demolish the old First Security Bank Building. The challenge was upheld and the building was renovated.

Residential

There are approximately 300 housing units, consisting of condos and apartments, in the CCC. They are located in five residential towers, one of which is 99 West on South Temple (99 West). This residential skyscraper has replaced the demolished Inn at Temple Square on the northwest corner of the west block, South Temple and West Temple Streets. Richard Court located on South Temple Street, directly across from Temple Square, topped in early February 2009 with more than 45 percent sold. Construction finished for the 23-floor Regent building in 2011, located on the south side of the east block (100 South Street). The Regent was one of the last buildings completed in the CCC. Other apartments are mostly built along 100 South Street, with some constructed along South Temple Street as well. The foundation, and first three floors of the 19-floor Cascade condo building was built as part of the original construction. Plans call for completion of the tower when most of the other residential units in the City Creek complex are sold, and market conditions are right.

Hotels

The Marriott Downtown at City Creek Hotel is the only hotel located in the CCC. Prior to the City Creek development it was named the Salt Lake City Marriott Downtown. The original hotel was opened on October 15, 1981 by Marriott International and underwent a renovation when the block was redeveloped.

Parking
CCC has 5,600 vehicle spaces that are located on the two blocks underground the development. The parking is mixed use, serving monthly, daily and residential use. The parking is managed by Utah Property Management Associates, LLC., a sister company of City Creek Reserve Inc.

Demolition and construction

Demolition of the site's old structures commenced in November 2006. By February 2007, the Inn at Temple Square had been completely demolished and work was underway to demolish the old parking structure for the Crossroads Plaza Mall. The destruction proceeded across the site from west to east, with several businesses remaining open until a short time before their scheduled demolition. Macy’s and Nordstrom had both closed by early February 2007. On August 18, 2007 the twenty-story Key Bank Tower was imploded and was one of the final steps to demolition completion. Demolition was completed by the end of 2007, and was followed by another six months of excavation and site preparation. By July 2008, most of the below-surface structures of the Crossroads block located to the southeast of the Main and South Temple streets intersection were complete. The parking structure beneath the future Nordstrom site was complete on the southwestern corner of the block. The central core of the thirty-two story condo tower, as well as the base-work for three additional residential structures located along the northern edge of the block, had begun initial construction by mid-2008.

Building Envelope consultant, Morrison Hershfield provided services on issues from schematic through construction phases of the CCC project. This included two underground parking garages, five residential/office buildings, multiple retail stores, one building rehabilitation, and areas around and beneath the man-made stream and fountain areas. The design of the air barrier system was developed based on a continuous air barrier membrane for all opaque wall areas tied in with the glazing and roofing/waterproofing systems.

Rebar was set into place to the south of the newly relocated Key Bank Tower located on the eastern edge of the ZCMI block to the east of the Crossroads block by the end of July 2008. The remainder of the ZCMI block had just completed initial site preparation by this time with demolition of the remaining portion of the ZCMI Mall completed by January 2009.

The food court section, located between Key Bank and Eagle Gate towers opened on June 10, 2009 after a 2-day delay.

The first condominiums, Richard's Court, were finished during the spring of 2010. The first tenant, a Deseret Book flagship store, opened on the first floor of Richard's Court in April 2010.

Public sentiment

A number of critics opposed the sky-bridge, which was built to funnel shoppers through the development. The critics included many South-end merchants who expressed concern that the sky-bridge would divert traffic from street-level stores adjacent to the development. They state a similar result occurred thirty years ago after the construction of the two malls the CCC replaced, during which longtime merchants such as Auerbachs, Paris Company, Wolfs, and Broadway Music all closed shop and either relocated or went out of business.

Some observers felt CCC was an inappropriate project for the LDS Church.  They argued that the high investment in consumerism and promoting conspicuous consumption neglected religious principles, and instead suggested that funds would be better spent on community resources, welfare services, or humanitarian outreach.  Others disagreed, saying the CCC brought jobs and beauty to the downtown, and the LDS Church had a duty to uplift properties near Temple Square and invest its private, commercial revenues.  The LDS Church has stated that no tithing money was used for construction of the complex, with the project financed through the church's commercial real-estate arm, PRI. In 2019 a whistleblower from the LDS Church's investment firm disputed this, alleging that the LDS Church had secretly transferred $1.4 Billion from funds set aside for charitable causes to the CCC during the financial crisis of 2009.

In 2008, the Sierra Club issued a report of environmentally responsible actions taken by communities of faith in each state.  It cited the LDS Church's development of CCC as one of the 60 pilot projects selected to finalize the Leadership in Energy and Environmental Design -- Neighborhood Development (LEED-ND) certification process.

See also

 City Creek (Utah)

References

Further reading
 http://www.huffingtonpost.com/2012/03/22/city-creek-mormon-mall_n_1372695.html

External links

 Official website
 City Creek Living
 Nordstrom Saltlake City

2012 establishments in Utah
Buildings and structures in Salt Lake City
Deseret Management Corporation
Mixed-use developments in Utah
Properties of the Church of Jesus Christ of Latter-day Saints
Taubman Centers
Shopping malls in Utah
Tourist attractions in Salt Lake City